Albanian military aircraft include all airplanes and helicopters which have been operated by the Albanian Air Force since its formal inception in 1947.  Since Albania has no domestic aircraft manufacturing capacity, all aircraft have been procured from other countries.  Additionally, the country's limited resources have meant that such procurement has been primarily through foreign military aid provided to Albania for strategic reasons.  Initially, the Warsaw Pact provided equipment through the 1950s, but after a political rift, China supplanted them as the country's main benefactor.  After the end of the Cold War and a significant shift in Albanian international relations, as well as a re-posturing of the Albanian Armed Forces, the air force has sought more modern support helicopters from Western Europe to support its new role in partnership with NATO.

Fighters
In concert with the Albanian Air Force's primary mission for most of its existence to defend the country's airspace, approximately two of every three aircraft which have served with the force have been fighters.

Yakovlev Yak-9 
The first aircraft to actually arrive for service with the Albanian Air Force were a dozen Yakovlev Yak-9 piston-engine fighters provided by the Soviet Union from stockpiles of World War II equipment.  Among the twelve was included a single two-seat operational conversion trainer variant.  The aircraft were not competitive with NATO jet fighters that had entered service in Europe by the time the Yak-9 went into service in Albania in 1951.  However, they were only intended as a stop-gap to allow the force to develop its organization and skills prior to the provision of its own jet fighter force.  Very rapidly after the arrival of jets, the Yak-9 was withdrawn from service in 1956 and its unit converted to the MiG-15.

Yakovlev Yak-23 
Albania Air Forces nver received or used the Yak-23 ref></ref> probably from Poland. However, their service is unknown.

Mikoyan-Gurevich MiG-15 

The Albanian Air Force gained a significant capability upgrade with the introduction of its first jet aircraft, the Mikoyan-Gurevich MiG-15.  The Soviet Union provided several of the MiG-15bis improved version of the basic MiG-15 fighter which had gained fame in the Korean War.  Soviet deliveries in 1955 replaced the Yak-9 and begin expanding the country's air defense capability, while China stepped in with further examples later.  In addition to the single-seaters, several two-seat MiG-15UTI training aircraft were delivered, including examples built in Czechoslovakia under the CS.102 designation.  Chinese-supplied single-seaters were Soviet-built but often reported under the Chinese J-2 or F-2 designations, while Chinese-supplied two-seat FT-2 trainers were actually Chinese-built.  Total numbers are difficult to ascertain, with reports of between fifty and eighty single-seat MiG-15 fighters having been acquired along with as much as half that many two-seat trainers.  While the MiG-15 rapidly faded from being a front-line aircraft, the relatively simple design remained in service in quantity in Albania for some time, with a few of both one- and two-seat versions reported on strength as late as 2000.

Mikoyan-Gurevich MiG-19 and Shenyang J-6 

While the MiG-15 had introduced the Albanian military into the jet age, it was rapidly apparent that an upgrade would be necessary to give the country a defense against the next generation of NATO aircraft.  The MiG-15 did not carry missiles, and so at the end of the 1950s, the Soviet Union delivered a dozen Mikoyan-Gurevich MiG-19PM.  These fighters, armed only with air-to-air missiles, complemented the gun-armed MiG-15 in the air defense role.  After splitting with the Soviet supply chain, the MiG-19PM airframes were traded to China for shipments of Shenyang J-6 aircraft under the export designation F-6.  These aircraft carried both guns and missiles while being somewhat less sophisticated, yet offering the same basic performance as the original MiG-19PM.  Nearly 80 of these aircraft were delivered, with some remaining until the very end of the air force's fighter operations in 2005.  No FT-6 two-seat operational conversion trainers were ever deliverd to Albania.

Shenyang F-5

Having severed ties with the Soviet Union, Albania turned to China for support of its military build-up.  While the Soviets had already delivered some MiG-19 interceptors and China would later deliver large numbers of the MiG-19 derived J-6, a more immediate solution was provided by Beijing in the form of the Shenyang J-5, derived from the subsonic Mikoyan-Gurevich MiG-17.  The Soviets had never provided the MiG-17 to Albania, and it was inferior to the already employed MiG-19PM in speed and armament.  However, the Albanian government was finding itself at odds with NATO, the Warsaw Pact, and most immediately with its neighbor, Yugoslavia, so relatively rapid deliveries of the J-5 under its export designation F-5 were made beginning in 1962.  The aircraft were a significant upgrade over the MiG-15 and F-2 aircraft that equipped most Albanian units at the time with better speed and armament.  Approximately 20% of the delivered aircraft were two-seat operational conversion trainers designated FT-5.  More than eighty F-5 single-seat and twenty FT-5 two-seat aircraft would enter Albanian service, but they did not fare well in air policing duties against Yugoslavian incursions due to their limited speed.  Nevertheless, the F-5 would remain a staple of Albanian regiments for decades with the final examples being withdrawn with the cessation of all fighter operations by Albania in 2005.

Chengdu F-7

1970 saw delivery of the most advanced combat aircraft to ever enter service with the Albanian Air Force.  The Chengdu F-7A is the export version of China's indigenous development of the Soviet-designed Mikoyan-Gurevich MiG-21.  While one of the earliest versions of this Chinese fighter, it still represented a major upgrade over the numerous F-5 and F-6 fighters equipping Albanian regiments.  Locally called the MiG-21F even though they were completely Chinese-built and supplied, the F-7A provided the Albanians with their only Mach 2 capable aircraft.  Only twelve aircraft were delivered, and they equipped a single squadron of the Albanian Air Force.  Initially deployed to Rinas Air Base with Aviation Regiment 7594.  In 1976 the squadron moved to Gjadër Air Base as the 1st Squadron of Aviation Regiment 5646 (later re-designated Aviation Regiment 4010).  After the base's deactivation in 2000, the aircraft were stored until 2002.  Two surviving examples were moved back to Rinas and assigned to the 2nd Squadron of Aviation Regiment 4020, though it is unclear whether they were actually flown before they were officially retired in 2004.  During the aircraft's operational career, two aircraft were lost to accidents (one in 1974 and one in 1982).

Other fixed-wing aircraft
While the vast majority of fixed-wing aircraft in the Albanian Air Force have been fighters, a small selection of other aircraft have been employed for transport, training, and other uses.  The small size of the country and its defensive posture limited the need for military airlift, with most transport tasks being within the scope of the country's helicopter fleet.  While Albania did maintain a meaningful number of training aircraft, these were withdrawn as the fighter force was mothballed, and other fixed-wing operations were reduced.  2011 saw the final fixed-wing operations with the withdrawal of the final transport and training aircraft from service.

Polikarpov Po-2 
Along with the initial delivery of Yak-9 fighters, the Soviet Union provided four Polikarpov Po-2 utility biplanes to the country.  Capable of a variety of utility roles, the pre-World War II design was primarily used for aerial application in support of restoring the country's agricultural capability after the war.  These simple but rugged biplanes were used for several years, with the final withdrawal happening in 1964 after the introduction into service of the An-2.

Yakovlev Yak-11 and Yak-18 
The third component of early Soviet-supplied equipment for the Albanian Air Force consisted of the standard tandem-seat advanced and primary trainers.  Four Yakovlev Yak-11 advanced trainers and four Yakovlev Yak-18 primary trainers were delivered in 1952 to establish Albania's air academy flying program.  While these aircraft were a good match with the Yak-9 fighters then in service, a more modern primary trainer was provided in the form of the Yak-18A which was equipped with tricycle gear as opposed to the original model's tail-dragging arrangement.  18 of the newer Yak-18A were supplied and equipped the air academy until most of these aircraft were traded in by 1963 in return for CJ-6 aircraft.

Nanchang CJ-6 

As with fighters, the political shift from the Soviet Union to China led to the decision to re-equip the training fleet with the Chinese-built Nanchang CJ-6 basic trainer.  Twenty of these aircraft, often reported under the designation PT-6 were delivered and they remained the primary trainer of the Albanian air academy through its retirement by the 2010s.

Ilyushin Il-14 
While the small size of Albania limits the requirements for fixed-wing airlift capacity, the country acquired an Ilyushin Il-14M in 1957 for general transport duties, including movement of government personnel.  This example served for several years until joined by a second Il-14M, as well as an Il-14P built by VEB in East Germany and an Il-14T built by Avia in Czechoslovakia.  The secretive nature of Albania during the Cold War has led to some uncertainty about these deliveries with as many as eight Il-14 aircraft reported to be in service.  The four aforementioned aircraft were placed in storage in 1992 where they were attacked by rioters in 1997, putting them beyond repair.  The aircraft were finally scrapped in 2002.

Ilyushin Il-28 

A single Ilyushin Il-28 bomber was delivered by the Soviet Union in 1957.  This was traded to China for a single license-built Il-28, designated H-5, in 1971.  While designed as a bomber, it is unclear what use Albania made of their solitary example.  Reports have included reconnaissance and target towing, but the aircraft remained in service through 1992 when it was put into storage at Tirana Airport.

Harbin Y-5 

The rugged and seemingly anachronistic Antonov An-2 biplane transport was a good match for Albania's limited need for transport, offering a simple and easy-to-maintain light transport.  However, none were acquired from the Soviet Union during the period of Soviet support.  Instead it would be 1963 before the first aircraft would be delivered by the Chinese as the Y-5, license-built at Harbin.  Thirteen of the rugged biplanes would be acquired and would go on to be the last fixed-wing airplanes to serve in the Albanian Air Force with the last Y-5 retired in 2011.

Helicopters
Albania's small size, rugged terrain and limited infrastructure make the country prime territory for helicopters.  Helicopter use by the air force began in 1957 and after the withdrawal of the last fixed-wing aircraft the branch became and remains an exclusively helicopter-equipped force.  Initial helicopters were Soviet supplied, with additional examples provided by China, but as Albania began opening up at the Cold War, they began acquiring a variety of western types.

Mil Mi-1 
Three Mil Mi-1 light utility helicopters, the first helicopter type to be serial-produced in the Soviet Union, were provided in 1957 to begin the Albanian Air Force's helicopter force.  The light helicopters were primarily used for training and liaison and served into the 1960s.

Mil Mi-4 and Harbin Z-5

Écureuil

The first western type to enter service with Albania was the popular Aérospatiale AS.350B Écureuil, of which four were delivered in 1991.  The Écureuil was also the first turbine-powered helicopter in service, operating as a light utility helicopter.  The aircraft were given civil registrations and painted in a bright blue civilian scheme to show clearly their assignment to non-military government tasks including carrying important government personnel, search and rescue, and assistance for the police.  A single example has crashed and, while controlled by the air force into the 2000s, the helicopters have been transferred to the Albanian government's Ministry of the Interior where they continue to serve in the same role.

Summary
(Table order: Fighters, Bombers, Transports, Trainers, Other, Helicopters)
(Note: a " - " means the information is unknown, not yet added, or not applicable)

See also 
Albanian Air Force
List of air forces

Notes

References
 Viroli, Elio Aviacioni Ushtarak Ahquipetare, Panorama Difesa magazine, June 1992, pag 38–44.

Albania-related lists
Lists of military aircraft
Military equipment of Albania